Grace Clinton is an English footballer who plays as a midfielder for Bristol City of the Women's Championship, on loan from Manchester United of the English Women's Super League.

Club career

Everton
Clinton came through the Everton academy. In preseason ahead of the 2020–21 campaign, then-16-year-old Clinton was called up to train with the first team after manager Willie Kirk singled her out as "a really talented teenager, but she's probably our sixth-choice midfielder. She could play for every Championship team and possibly a couple of WSL teams." She scored during a 5–0 preseason friendly win against Championship side Blackburn Rovers. She made her competitive senior debut for the club on 3 October 2020, appearing as a 74th-minute substitute for Izzy Christiansen in a 6–0 FA WSL victory over Aston Villa. On 1 November 2020, Clinton was named as a substitute for the delayed 2020 Women's FA Cup Final at Wembley Stadium. She was unused as Everton lost to Manchester City 3–1 in extra-time. She made her first start for the club on 18 November 2020 in a Merseyside derby as Everton beat Liverpool 1–0 in the League Cup.

Manchester United
On 15 July 2022, it was announced Clinton had signed for Manchester United on a three-year contract. On 14 January 2023, having not yet made an appearance for Manchester United, Clinton joined Women's Championship side Bristol City on loan for the remainder of the season. She scored a 93rd minute equaliser on her debut in a game that City ended up winning 3-2 against Coventry United W.F.C. She then received two yellow cards and was ultimately sent off in her next game against Lewes F.C. Women in the FA Women's League Cup.

International career
Clinton has been capped by England at under-17 level. Having scored four times during qualifying, Clinton was named to the England under-19 squad for the 2022 UEFA Women's Under-19 Championship.

Career statistics

Club 
As of match played 8 February 2023.

References 

Living people
Everton F.C. (women) players
Manchester United W.F.C. players
Bristol City W.F.C. players
English women's footballers
England women's youth international footballers
2003 births
Women's association football midfielders